Aldo, Giovanni & Giacomo are an Italian trio of comedians, actors, directors and screenwriters, composed of Aldo Baglio (born 28 September 1958), Giovanni Storti (born 20 February 1957) and Giacomo Poretti (born 26 April 1956). Performing in cinema, theatre and television, they are among the most successful and widely known Italian comedians.

Their humour is typically Milanese, involving scenes that develop from a simple idea, and that are often centred on stereotypical differences between Northern and Southern Italy.

Biography

Early 
Cataldo Baglio, better known simply as Aldo, was born in Palermo but grew up in Milan, where he met Giovanni Storti.
The two both studied mime and dance at the School of Drama of the Teatro Arsenale of Milan. Giovanni graduated in 1977, and Aldo in 1978, and the two immediately took part in various cabaret shows including E domani? (1979) and Il suggestibile" as well as performing in various television dramas, including Vacanze di professione. Giacomo Poretti, meanwhile, was part of the cabaret duo "Hansel and Strudel" along with Marina Massironi who was his girlfriend at the time, and later his wife.

Theatre
The actress Marina Massironi, shoulder female comic trio nineties beginning of the new millennium.
The trio as we know it now was formed in 1985 when Baglio and Storti met Poretti and invited him to make sketches with them. A few months later the trio who called themselves Aldo, Giovanni and Giacomo, performed in theatre with Marina Massironi until 1991, in shows such as Summer Lightning (1992) (directed by Paola Galassi), Back to the Gerund (with Flavio Oreglio and Antonio Cornacchione), Air Storm (1993) (directed by Giancarlo Bozzo), The Shorts (1996) (directed by Arturo Brachetti), and The Circus of Paolo Rossi (1995) (directed by Giampiero Solari and starring Paolo Rossi). In the 2005 act, along with Silvana Fallisi, entertainment Anplagghed directed by Arturo Brachetti. In 2012 the trio returns to the stage, with the theatre tour Ammutta Muddica.

Television
On television, they made their first appearance in the summer of 1992 alongside the comedy duo Zuzzurro and Gaspare in TG delle vacanze; in the same year, they took part in Su la testa!, conducted by Paolo Rossi. The following year they participated in Cielito Lindo with Claudio Bisio and in the period 1995-1997 they were in the cast of Mai dire Gol, transmission conducted by the Gialappa's Band.
In 1999, the three have staged the play who Tel chi el telùn, filmed and broadcast by Channel 5 and directed by Arturo Brachetti. The transmission has been repeated several times in the following years. They are back with the Gialappa's Band in 2004, proposing sketch transmission Mai dire domenica, while in 2008 are back on the air with two new plays, Anplagghed, broadcast by Channel 5 and Italy 1, and with Pur Purr Rid, which contained a mix of all the commitments of the trio, also participate to the last episode of Zelig. In 2009 they joined the cast of the transmission of Rai 3 Che tempo che fa. On 25 December 2013, they performed in a show on Radio Italian TV in the evening dedicated to the NPO Alice for Children. From 8 May 2014 Ammutta muddica is broadcast on Channel 5, divided into three events in prime time.

Cinema
Their big-screen debut was in 1997 with the film Three Men and a Leg, both of which are key players that directors, alongside Marina Massironi and Massimo Venier as a writer and director, in which they have repeated several typical sketches of their repertoire with a simple plot, thanks to which they have obtained the consent of the public and critical acclaim.

The success of the first film was repeated in 1998 with That's Life, always on the side of Marina Massironi as in Ask Me If I'm Happy, released in 2000 and able to collect the more than seventy billion lire, entering the top five films Italian most profitable ever. In 2002 it was the turn of The Legend of Al, John and Jack, followed in 2004 by Do You Know Claudia?, with only Massimo Venier director and Paola Cortellesi female lead.
In 2006 have taken up a special version of their eponymous play, called Anplagghed cinema. The comic trio then returned to the big screen on 19 December 2008 with an episodic film, Il cosmo sul comò, this time under the direction of comedian Marcello Cesena. On 12 February 2010, they participated as narrative voices in the documentary Oceans 3D, while on 17 December of the same year the film was released The Santa Claus Gang, the blockbuster of the season with over twenty-five million euros. After four years of absence from the halls, on 11 December 2014, the trio returned to the movies with The Rich, the Pauper and the Butler. In late 2016, it was followed by Fuga da Reuma Park, which received negative responses from critics and the public.

After a three year hiatus, they returned in January 2020 with I Hate Summer which received critical acclaim.

Filmography
Three Men and a Leg (1997)
That's Life (1998)
All the Moron's Men (1999)
Ask Me If I'm Happy (2000)
The Legend of Al, John and Jack (2002)
Do You Know Claudia? (2004)
Anplagghed al cinema (2006) – theatrical cut
Il cosmo sul comò (2008)
The Santa Claus Gang (2010)
Ammutta muddica al cinema (2013) – theatrical cut
The Rich, the Pauper and the Butler (2014)
Fuga da Reuma Park (2017)
I Hate Summer (2020)
Il grande giorno (2022)

Theatre
I corti di Aldo, Giovanni e Giacomo (1996): "The short [sketches] of Aldo, Giovanni and Giacomo"
Tel chi el telùn (1999): , "Here it is the tarpaulin", as the word "telùn" is Milanese for "telone" (En. "tarpaulin", meaning the circus tent); the title is a pun on the phonetically similar word "terùn" (It. "terrone", a mocking-dispregiative word which indicates people from Southern Italy)
Potevo rimanere offeso! (2001): "I could have been offended!" – the show is centred on their Swiss characters
Anplagghed (2006): an ironic transcription of "Unplugged"
Ammutta muddica (2012): Sicilian for "Spingi mollica" ("push the crumb"), which means "get busy!"
The Best of Aldo, Giovanni e Giacomo (2016)

Miscellaneous

 Silvana Fallisi (who has collaborated several times with the trio, for example in Ask me if I'm happy) is married to Aldo, while Marina Massironi was married to Giacomo. Giacomo is currently married to Daniela Cristofori, the actress who appeared in Ask me if I'm happy and Do you know Claudia?. The two have a son named Emanuele.
 The title of their film The gang of Santas was chosen by their fans on Facebook.
 All three are fans of Inter Milan.
 Aldo is 175 cm tall, Giovanni 165 cm and Giacomo 158 cm.

See also
Tafazzi

External links

Italian comedians
Italian comedy troupes
Comedy collectives
Trios